The pickerelweed borer moth (Bellura densa) is a species of moth of the family Noctuidae. It is found from Maryland to southern Florida, west to Indiana and Louisiana.

Adults have brown to tan forewings and a reniform spot which is partly filled with orange. Adults are on wing from June to August in two generations in the southern part of the range.

The larvae feed on various wetland plants, including Typha, Pontederia and Eichhornia species. Young larvae feed on the surface, but later instars burrow into the leaves or rhizomes.

References

Moths described in 1865
Caradrinini
Moths of North America